John Miller is an American basketball coach who served as the head coach of the Murray State Teachers College men's basketball team from 1942 to 1947.

A former player at Murray College, Miller spent five seasons as the school's freshman coach before becoming head coach in 1942. In his first season as head coach, Miller coached the Thoroughbreds, led by future Basketball Hall of Famer Joe Fulks, to a fourth-place finish in the 1943 NAIA Division I men's basketball tournament. This would be the school's only postseason appearance under Miller. He resigned three games into the 1947–48 season and was replaced by the school's first basketball coach Carlisle Cutchin.

References

Living people
American men's basketball coaches
American men's basketball players
Murray State Racers men's basketball coaches
Murray State Racers men's basketball players
Year of birth missing (living people)